is a railway station on the Hakodate Main Line in Mori, Hokkaido, Japan, operated by Hokkaido Railway Company (JR Hokkaido). Opened in 1951, the station is scheduled to close from the start of the revised timetable in March 2017.

Lines
The station is numbered H63.

Station layout
The station has two side platforms serving two tracks on the otherwise single line. The platforms are linked by a level crossing for passenger use. The station is unstaffed.

History
The station opened on 19 May 1951. With the privatization of Japanese National Railways (JNR) on 1 April 1987, the station came under the control of JR Hokkaido.

In June 2016, JR Hokkaido announced that it intended to close the station along with four other unstaffed stations on the line in March 2017, due to low passenger usage.

Passenger statistics
In fiscal 2015, the station was used on average by less than one passenger daily.

Surrounding area
  National Route 5

See also
 List of railway stations in Japan

References

Stations of Hokkaido Railway Company
Railway stations in Hokkaido Prefecture
Railway stations in Japan opened in 1951
Railway stations closed in 2017
2017 disestablishments in Japan